Duhé or Duhe is a surname. Notable people with the surname include:

A. J. Duhe (born 1955), American football player
John M. Duhé Jr. (born 1933), American judge 
Elley Duhé (born 1992), American singer and songwriter
Lawrence Duhé (1887–1960), American jazz musician